Olaf Wildeboer Faber (born 4 March 1983 in Sabadell, Catalonia, Spain) is a freestyle swimmer. He is of Dutch origin. His parents, both born and raised in Netherlands, moved to Spain in 1978, and settled in Sabadell. His brother is Aschwin Wildeboer.

Wildeboer competed for Spain at the 2004 Summer Olympics. He won two silver medals at the 2005 Mediterranean Games.

See also
 List of Spanish records in swimming

Notes

References

 Spanish Olympic Committee
 Profile on Zwemkroniek (in Dutch)

External links
 
 
 
 

1983 births
Living people
Dutch male freestyle swimmers
Swimmers from Catalonia
Spanish male freestyle swimmers
Olympic swimmers of Spain
Swimmers at the 2004 Summer Olympics
Sportspeople from Sabadell
Spanish people of Dutch descent
Mediterranean Games silver medalists for Spain
Mediterranean Games medalists in swimming
Swimmers at the 2005 Mediterranean Games